Strus or Struś is a surname. It may refer to:

 Lusia Strus (born 1969), American writer and actress
 Józef Struś or Josephus Struthius (1510–1568), Polish professor of medicine
 Max Strus (born 1996), American basketball player
 Mikołaj Struś (1577–1627), Polish starosta

See also 
 

Polish-language surnames